Leave Me Lonely may refer to:

"Leave Me Lonely" (Gary Morris song), 1986
"Leave Me Lonely" (Hilltop Hoods song), 2018
"Leave Me Lonely", a song by Ariana Grande from Dangerous Woman, 2016
"Leave Me Lonely", a song by Imelda May from Life Love Flesh Blood, 2017

See also
"Don't Leave Me Lonely", a 1983 song by Bryan Adams
 Leave Me Alone (disambiguation)